Sesamothamnus is a genus of plant in family Pedaliaceae.

Species
Species include:
Sesamothamnus benguellensis Welw.
Sesamothamnus busseanus Engl.
Sesamothamnus guerichii (Engl.) E.A.Bruce
Sesamothamnus leistneranus
Sesamothamnus lugardii N.E.Br.
Sesamothamnus rivae Engl.

References

Lamiales genera
Pedaliaceae
Taxonomy articles created by Polbot